Catherine Wright Burcher (née Kerry; 1 July 1849 – 19 May 1921) was a New Zealand artist.

Biography 
Burcher was born Catherine Wright Kerry in Bebington, Cheshire, United Kingdom, to Rubens James Kerry. On 9 May 1871 in Wallasey, Cheshire, she married Albert Edward Burcher, and they arrived in Auckland, New Zealand in 1878.

She was trained by a fellow of the Royal Art Society before she left the United Kingdom. She was well known for both her painting and glazing china. Burcher was secretary of an Auckland society for ladies who painted china, and she was given several pieces of china by Sir George Grey for her to copy.

Burcher was a member of the Auckland Art Society from its foundation and exhibited with them multiple times from 1881 to 1895. She also exhibited with the Society of Artists in 1879 and the Colonial and Indian exhibition in London in 1886; was on the committee of and exhibited with the New Zealand Art Students Association from 1884 to 1885; and taught art at the Auckland Girls' High School and in 1882 organised an exhibition of art by the students.

During World World I, she made a copy of Edmund Blair Leighton's In Time of Peril, which is in the Auckland City Art Gallery (now Auckland Art Gallery Toi o Tāmaki) collection. It took 12 months for Burcher to make the copy and she consulted Leighton for advice as she painted. Sources are divided on how much Burcher's copy sold for to benefit the Red Cross: Platts states it was £2000, whereas her obituary suggests it was £800, both, however, were well above its estimated value of £500.

She died in Auckland on 19 May 1921.

References

External links 

 Fort Street, Auckland by K. Burcher in the Auckland Art Gallery Toi o Tāmaki 

1849 births
1921 deaths
Artists from Auckland
Artists from Merseyside
English expatriates in New Zealand
New Zealand art teachers
New Zealand ceramicists
New Zealand schoolteachers
New Zealand women ceramicists
New Zealand women painters
Porcelain painters
19th-century New Zealand artists
20th-century New Zealand artists
19th-century New Zealand women artists
20th-century New Zealand women artists
19th-century New Zealand educators
20th-century New Zealand educators
19th-century New Zealand painters
20th-century New Zealand painters